Ruuli (or Ruruuli) is the Bantu language spoken by  the Baruuli and Banyala people of Uganda primarily in Nakasongola and Kayunga districts. It is closely related to Ganda and Gwere.

References

External links
 Ruuli DoReCo corpus compiled by Alena Witzlack-Makarevich, Saudah Namyalo, Anatol Kiriggwajjo and Zarina Molochieva. Audio recordings of narrative texts with transcriptions time-aligned at the phone level, translations, and time-aligned morphological annotations.

Languages of Uganda
Nyoro-Ganda languages